Bramley Park is a community park situated near the centre of Bramley, four miles west of Leeds city centre, West Yorkshire, England.

The park contains open spaces, sports pitches, tennis courts, a bowling green, a children's playground, a war memorial and a
formal garden. Set on a hillside, it also offers views of the countryside. A free, 5 km parkrun takes place every Saturday at 9am (except for Bramley Carnival weekend) and a 2 km junior parkrun takes place at 9am every Sunday.

Annual events such as Bramley Carnival and a fireworks display are also hosted in the park.

References 

Parks and commons in Leeds